Oracle Night is a 2003 novel by American author Paul Auster.

The novel is about a writer named Sidney Orr (a short, Americanized version of the Polish surname Orlovsky), who, after making a miraculous recovery from near fatal illness, buys a new notebook and starts writing a story about a man who completely changed his life when he realised how much his existence was ruled by randomness.

The base premises for the book is this, Sidney Orr trying to come back to his life and begin writing again, but a lot of things happen in his life at the same time, and the reader gets introduced not only to Sidney's work and personal life, but also in some extent to the life of the person in his work-in-progress novel. Before the end of this period in Sidney's life, events will take place that are truly life-altering, and Sidney will, much like the fictional character he writes of, have to deal with issues and questions he has previously (perhaps unconsciously) been avoiding for several years.

Biographical
The main character, Sidney Orr, is in many ways quite similar to Paul Auster. They are both residents of Brooklyn,
middle-aged, married, and, of course, writers. Some similarities between Auster and a supporting character
in Oracle Night—John Trause—are also apparent. Trause, an anagram of Auster, also lived in Paris for a period of his life.

External links
 
 http://books.guardian.co.uk/departments/generalfiction/story/0,6000,1142856,00.html
 http://living.scotsman.com/books.cfm?id=57412004
 http://news.bbc.co.uk/2/hi/programmes/newsnight/review/3451735.stm
 http://books.guardian.co.uk/reviews/generalfiction/0,6121,1142671,00.html

2004 American novels
Novels by Paul Auster
Henry Holt and Company books
Novels about writers
Novels set in Brooklyn